Wakatipu High School is a state coeducational secondary school located in Queenstown, Otago, New Zealand. Serving Years 9 to 13 (ages 13 to 18), a total of  students attend the school as of 

The school was originally located at 68 Fryer Street in central Queenstown. The school relocated to a new site at 47/49 Red Oaks Drive, Frankton during the 2017/18 summer holidays. Development of the new Wakatipu High School cost approximately $50 million and took place over the course of 2017. The school was developed with a controversial open plan design with the intention of encouraging constructive communication between students. Further development of the school was undertaken in 2020, with an extension of the school being completed in mid-2022 and a second gymnasium being completed at the start of 2023.

Houses 
Wakatipu High School uses a house system with different colours: Arthur House (blue), Duncan House (black), Fox House (red), Hay House (green), and Mackenzie House (orange). Within these houses are a dean and student leaders. The houses are named after historical figures from the region.

Notable alumni 

 Harriet Miller-Brown, alpine skier and champion slalom skier
Alice Robinson, alpine skier and champion slalom skier

Controversies 

 On 8 February 2019, twenty-one students were stood down for consuming alcohol and other illicit substances, as well as vaping on school grounds during a sporting event.
 For the School Strike for Climate on 15 March 2019, students from the school who attended the march and were not part of the environmental group were marked either "Explained but unjustified" or "Truant" on the school roll.
During a 12-day camp for Year 10 students in 2020, several students were faced with disciplinary action following a prank in which the students ejaculated, urinated and sprinkled their pubic hair over a fellow student's sleeping bag and pillow.

References

External links 

 School website

Secondary schools in Otago
Buildings and structures in Queenstown, New Zealand